Tom Wright may refer to:

The arts and entertainment 
 Tom Wright (American actor) (born 1952), American screen and theatre actor
 Tom Wright (architect) (born 1957), designer of the Burj al Arab hotel in Dubai UAE
 Thomas M. Wright (born 1983), also known as Tom, Australian actor/director
 Tom Wright (Australian playwright) (born 1968), Australian theatre writer and director
 Tom Wright (1923–2002), Scottish poet, dramatist, and television writer, whose short story inspired the movie Hannibal Brooks
 Tom Wright (record producer), also known as Cube::Hard and Stargazer, English record producer and owner of the music label RFUGrey
 Tom Wright, former producer of The Bugle podcast

Sportspeople
 Tom Wright (Australian footballer) (1882–1916), Victorian Football League player
 Tom Wright (baseball) (1923–2017), Major League Baseball player between 1948–1956
 Tom Wright (cricketer) (born 1983), English cricketer
 Tom Wright (curler), American curler
 Tom Wright (greyhound trainer) (1861–1956), English greyhound trainer
 Tom Wright (1930s rugby league), Australian rugby league player for the North Sydney Bears
 Tom Wright (sports executive) (born 1953), former commissioner of the Canadian Football League and former director of operations for UFC Canada
 Tom Wright (rugby, born 1997), Australian rugby league and rugby union player

Other
 Tom A. Wright (born 1952), member of the Florida Senate
 N. T. Wright (born 1948), English Anglican bishop, biblical scholar, and theologian
 Tom Wright (bishop of East Carolina) (1904–1997), American Episcopal bishop
 Tom Wright (trade unionist) (1902–1981), Australian trade unionist

See also 
 Thomas Wright (disambiguation)
 Tommy Wright (disambiguation)